The St. James Episcopal Church in Meeker, Colorado is a historic church at 368 4th Street.  It was built in 1890 and was added to the National Register of Historic Places in 1978.

It was deemed "significant because it is the first church in Meeker, as well as one of the oldest Episcopal churches in Colorado. As such it has played and is still playing an important role in the religious life of the area."

References

Buildings and structures in Rio Blanco County, Colorado
Episcopal church buildings in Colorado
Churches on the National Register of Historic Places in Colorado
Churches completed in 1890
19th-century Episcopal church buildings
National Register of Historic Places in Rio Blanco County, Colorado